Britt William Reames (born August 19, 1973) is a former Major League Baseball pitcher.

Amateur career
Reames attended Seneca Senior High School in Seneca, South Carolina. He was selected out of high school 46th round of the 1992 Major League Baseball draft by the Texas Rangers, but opted to play college baseball for the Citadel Bulldogs. In 1994, he played collegiate summer baseball in the Cape Cod Baseball League for the Yarmouth-Dennis Red Sox. He was selected 17th round of the 1995 Major League Baseball draft by the St. Louis Cardinals.

Professional career

A promising minor league prospect early on, Reames had an impressive 1996 season with single-A Peoria, Reames was named St. Louis Cardinals Minor League Pitcher of the Year when finished with 15 wins and a 1.90 ERA.  However, he sat out the 1997 and 1998 seasons while he recovered from Tommy John surgery.

After recovering, Reames made his debut in the major leagues for the Cardinals in 2000.  In that year he started seven games, managed a 2.88 ERA, and contributed to his team's World Series contention, giving up one run in 9.2 playoff innings.

Over the next several years, he pitched for the Oakland Athletics, the Montreal Expos, and the Pittsburgh Pirates, always switching between the majors and the minors. On August 11, 2006 he was called up by the Pirates when Josh Sharpless went on the disabled list.  On August 28, 2006, he was designated for assignment. He has not pitched professionally since 2006.

He spent three years as the pitching coach at Furman from 2008 through 2010 before taking the same position at his alma mater prior to the 2011 season.  He was inducted into the Hall of Fame at The Citadel in November 2008.

References

External links

1973 births
Living people
American expatriate baseball players in Canada
Arkansas Travelers players
Baseball coaches from South Carolina
Baseball players from South Carolina
Edmonton Trappers players
Furman Paladins baseball coaches
Indianapolis Indians players
Leones del Escogido players
American expatriate baseball players in the Dominican Republic
Major League Baseball pitchers
Memphis Redbirds players
Montreal Expos players
New Jersey Cardinals players
Oakland Athletics players
Ottawa Lynx players
People from Seneca, South Carolina
Peoria Chiefs players
Pittsburgh Pirates players
Potomac Cannons players
Sacramento River Cats players
Savannah Cardinals players
St. Louis Cardinals players
The Citadel Bulldogs baseball coaches
The Citadel Bulldogs baseball players
Yarmouth–Dennis Red Sox players